Beneden-Haastrecht is a town in the Dutch province of South Holland. It is a part of the municipality of Krimpenerwaard, and lies about 3 km southeast of Gouda.

The statistical area "Beneden-Haastrecht", which also can include the surrounding countryside, has a population of around 110.

Until 2015, Beneden-Haastrecht was part of Vlist.

References

Populated places in South Holland
Krimpenerwaard